The Saltillo Institute of Technology, or ITS, is located in the city of Saltillo, state capital of Coahuila, Mexico. It is a college level technological institution. Founded in July 1950 by Mexican President Miguel Alemán Valdez, it started operations on January 3, 1951.

History
Since its foundation, the institute has changed names several times. It was founded as Instituto Tecnológico de Coahuila, but then changed in 1968 to Instituto Tecnológico Regional de Coahuila. Again, by 1977, it was renamed to Instituto Tecnológico Regional de Saltillo and, finally, since 1981, as Instituto Tecnológico de Saltillo.

In 1951, the objective of the institution was to provide students technical degrees suitable for the industry; however, due to expansion, it later offered high school, engineering and graduate degrees. By 1951, enrollment consisted of barely 314 students, but after 55 years of existence, it currently amounts to 7,016 students: (6,963 at the undergraduate level and 53 at the postgraduate level) in addition to the school staff (4 directors, 23 department heads, 424 professors, 16 researchers, 357 administrative staff and 74 service staff).

The institute campus is made up of 35 buildings, 153 classrooms, 20 laboratories and 4 auditoriums.

Academics
Nowadays ITS offers the following degrees:

Undergraduate
Electrical Engineering
Electronic Engineering
Industrial Engineering
Materials Engineering
Computer Systems Engineering
Mechatronics Engineering
Computer Engineering
Business Management
Mechanical Engineering

Graduate
Ph.D. in materials
Master's degree in Materials Engineering
Master's degree in Industrial Engineering

List of directors
Its directors have been:
Santiago Tamez Anguiano  (1950–1951)
Narciso Urrutia Lozano  (1951–1952)
Segundo Rodríguez Alvarez  (1952)
Oscar Peart Pérez  (1952–1960)
Gabriel H. Acosta  (1960–1961)
Jorge Fernández Mier  (1961–1966)
Benjamín Rodríguez Zarzosa  (1966–1967)
Jorge Fernández Mier  (1967–1973)
Rodolfo Rosas Morales  (1973–1976)
David Hernandez Ochoa  (1976)
Luis Rosales Celis  (1976–1981)
Carlos Herrera Pérez  (1981–1983)
Manuel F. Flores Revuelta  (1983–1986)
Jesús H. Cano Ríos  (1986–1988)
José Claudio Tamez Saénz  (1988–1991)
Manuel F. Flores Revuelta  (1991–1996)
Juan Francisco Mancinas Casas  (1996–2001)
Enriqueta Gonzalez Aguilar  (2001–2005)
Jesús Contreras García (current, since August 2005)

External links
Instituto Tecnológico de Saltillo's Official Site

Universities and colleges in Coahuila
Saltillo
Educational institutions established in 1951
1951 establishments in Mexico